Lasiarchis hirsuta is a moth in the family Gelechiidae. It was described by Anthonie Johannes Theodorus Janse in 1958. It is found in Zimbabwe.

References

Gelechiinae
Moths described in 1958